Marcio Keizo Tanaka (born June 9, 1980) is a Japanese-Brazilian professional baseball shortstop, who plays for a team in the Japanese Industrial League. He attended Tokyo University of Agriculture and represented Brazil at  2013 World Baseball Classic.

References

External links
Baseball America

1980 births
Living people
Brazilian baseball players
Brazilian people of Japanese descent
Brazilian emigrants to Japan
Naturalized citizens of Japan
2013 World Baseball Classic players
Sportspeople from São Paulo